In mathematics,  sieved Jacobi polynomials are a family of sieved orthogonal polynomials, introduced by .  Their recurrence relations are a modified (or "sieved") version of the recurrence relations for Jacobi polynomials.

References

Orthogonal polynomials